K. Visalini is an Indian prodigy who is purported to have an officially tested IQ of 225. Visalini also holds several other records including the youngest person to receive CCNA certification and youngest person to receive EXIN cloud computing certification. K. Visalini has appeared in many conferences as chief guest and keynote speaker, including TEDxNITKSurakthal.

Life and career

Early life
K. Visalini was born in Tirunelveli, in Tamil Nadu, India, in 2000. Her father worked as an electrician and her mother worked as an announcer with All India Radio. Visalini was born with ankyloglossia. During her mother Ragamaliga's preparations for the Tamil Nadu Public Service Commission exams, her mother would often recite questions from the syllabus and their accompanying answers in the hopes that it would ameliorate Visalini's condition by encouraging echolalia.

Education
During her schooling, Visalini was double promoted twice. In lieu of continuing her ninth-grade education, she accepted an admission as an exceptional candidate into the B.Tech program at the Kalasalingam Academy of Research and Education. She participated in an accelerated program, allowing her to complete the undergraduate engineering program in three years as opposed to four. Visalini secured an aggregate GPA of 9.6 out of 10 with honors.

References

External links

2000 births
People from Tirunelveli
People from Tamil Nadu
Living people